Edgar Allen (1892–1943) was an American anatomist.

Edgar Allen may also refer to:

Edgar Johnson Allen (1866–1942), biologist
List of The Sandman characters
Edgar Van Nuys Allen (1900–1961), American doctor
Edgar Allen and Company, steel maker and engineer

See also
Edgar Allan (1842–1904), delegate to the Virginia Constitutional Convention of 1868

Edward Allen (disambiguation)